This is a list of the tertiary-level schools or academies of fine art in Italy that are recognised by the Ministero dell'Istruzione, dell'Università e della Ricerca, the Italian ministry of higher education.

Accademie di Belle Arti
The official Accademie di Belle Arti or academies of fine art which depend directly from the ministry are:

Legally recognised academies
Other academies which have ministerial recognition are:

See also
 List of art schools in Europe

References

Fine art
Italy